Saeid Mehri (born September 16, 1995) is an Iranian footballer who last played for Iranian club Esteghlal as a midfielder in Persian Gulf Pro League.

Career statistics

Club

Honours

Esteghlal 
Iran Pro League: 2021–22
Hazfi Cup runner-up: 2020–21
Iranian Super Cup:  2022

References

External links

 

Living people
1998 births
Tractor S.C. players
Iranian footballers
Association football midfielders
Esteghlal F.C. players
Persian Gulf Pro League players
People from Mianeh